Battalhüyük is a village in the Adıyaman District, Adıyaman Province, Turkey. Its population is 232 (2021).

The hamlets of Ballıca, Doluca, Karahurç and Yıldızlı are attached to the village.

References

Villages in Adıyaman District

Kurdish settlements in Adıyaman Province